Quintus Fabius Ambustus (flourished early 4th century BC) was a military leader of the Roman Republic, and the son of Marcus Fabius Ambustus. In 390 BC, when his father was pontifex maximus, he and his two brothers, Numerius and Caeso, were sent as emissaries to a Gaulish army besieging Clusium. Instead of entering into negotiations, however, the three Fabii gathered their forces and aided the citizens of Clusium in an attack against the Gauls, in which Quintus Fabius himself was said to have killed one of the Gaulish leaders.

Outraged, the Gauls demanded that the senate hand over the three brothers for violating "the law of nations". Instead, all three were honored by election as consular tribunes. Further incensed, the Gauls marched on Rome, defeated the Roman Army in the Battle of the Allia, and sacked the city. In 389 BC he was supposed to have been prosecuted for his actions at Clusium, but died before the trial could take place.

Many scholars believe the entire story of the events at Clusium to be fiction, as Clusium had no real reason to appeal to Rome for help, and the Gauls needed no real provocation to sack Rome. The story, it is hypothesized, exists to provide an explanation for an otherwise unmotivated attack on Rome, and to depict Rome as a bulwark of Italy against the Gauls.

In popular culture
Quintus Fabius Ambustus was played by Tony Kendall in the 1963 film Brennus, Enemy of Rome.

See also
 Ambustus, for other men with the same cognomen
 Fabius Ambustus, for other men who used the same combination of gens name and cognomen
 Fabia gens, for a comprehensive list of gens members

References

Roman consular tribunes
Fabii Ambusti
4th-century BC Romans
4th-century BC diplomats